The  Chicago Cardinals season was their 13th in the league. The team failed to improve on their previous year's 5–4 record, winning only two games. This was the last NFL season without a scheduled postseason or divisions.

This was the last season of ownership for Dr. David J. Jones, who sold the team to attorney Charles Bidwill for $50,000.

Schedule

Standings

References

1932
Chicago Cardinals
Chicago